Shahnewaz Kakoli (also spelled Shahneoyaj Cacoly ) is a Bangladeshi film, theatre and telefilm director. She made her debut as a director with the film Uttarer Sur (2012), which was screened in different international film festivals, including Goa International Film Festival, Kolkata International Film Festival (2012), and Third Eye Mumbai Film Festival. The film won 3 Bangladesh National Film Awards.

Career 
Before starting feature film direction Kakoli directed several telefilms and theatres. She is also a painter. Kakoli is influenced by Bengali film director Ritwik Ghatak.

In her first big screen film Uttarer Sur, she dealt with life of a singer and her little daughter who sing (and beg) in the street to earn their living.

Works

Films 
 Uttarer Sur (2012)
 Nodijon (2015)
 Jolrong

Telefilms and drama

References

Citations

Living people
Bangladeshi women film directors
Year of birth missing (living people)
Place of birth missing (living people)
Best Story National Film Award (Bangladesh) winners